Battle of Minsk may refer to one of the following battles:
 Operation Minsk, a military offensive of the Polish Army resulting in the recapture of Minsk from the Bolsheviks in 1919
 Battle of Białystok–Minsk in 1941 in the opening stage of Operation Barbarossa
 Minsk Offensive of 1944, an offensive of the Red Army, part of Operation Bagration